The Brahmagiri Wildlife Sanctuary is located in Kodagu District, Karnataka State, India, within the Western Ghats and about 250 km from Bangalore. The sanctuary covers an area of about 181 km and derives its name from the highest point of the mountain range, Brahmigiri Peak. It was declared a sanctuary on June 5, 1974.

Wildlife

Flora 
The sanctuary contains evergreen and semi-evergreen forests, and in the higher altitudes are grasslands with shola. Bamboo plants are widespread.

Fauna 
Mammals in the sanctuary include lion-tailed macaques, Indian elephants, gaurs, tigers, jungle cats, leopard cats, wild dogs, sloth bears, wild pigs, sambars, spotted deer, Nilgiri langurs, slender loris, bonnet macaques, common langurs, barking deer, mouse deer, Malabar giant squirrels, giant flying squirrels, Nilgiri martens, common otters, brown mongooses, civets, porcupines, and pangolins.

Pythons, cobras, king cobras, and malabar pit vipers are also found in the sanctuary, as are birds such as emerald doves, black bulbuls and Malabar trogons.

References

External links

Wildlife sanctuaries in Karnataka
1974 establishments in Karnataka
Protected areas established in 1974